The Divertimento No. 17 in D major, K. 334/320b was composed by Wolfgang Amadeus Mozart between 1779 and 1780 and was possibly composed for commemorating the graduation of a close friend of Mozart's, Georg Sigismund Robinig, from his law studies at the University of Salzburg in 1780. Lasting about 42 minutes, it is the longest of the divertimenti by Mozart. 

The third movement (the first Menuetto) from the divertimento remains so popular that it is often referred to as Mozart's Minuet, although this is clearly not the only minuet by Mozart. An excerpt from this movement was used in the animated film Yellow Submarine (1968) when the string quartet was being annihilated by the Blue Meanies.

Instrumentation
This divertimento is scored for 2 violins, viola, double bass and 2 horns.

Movements
This divertimento consists of 6 movements: 
Allegro (in D major and in sonata form)
Tema con variazioni (Andante) (in D minor, theme and 6 variations, fourth variation in D major)
Menuetto - Trio (in D major and in compound ternary form, trio in G major)
Adagio (in A major and in sonata form)
Menuetto - Trio I - Trio II (in D major and in rondo form, where the first trio is in D minor and the second trio is in B minor)
Rondo (Allegro) (in D major and in sonata rondo form)

In Kurt Sanderling's recording of this piece, both the Adagio and the second Menuetto are omitted.
In the recording with Florian Heyerick conducting the Kurpfälzisches Kammerorchester Mannheim, part of the Rondo is omitted.

See also
Divertimento No. 15 in B-flat major, K. 287

References

External links
 

Divertimento No. 17
Compositions in D major
1779 compositions
1780 compositions